The One San Miguel Avenue is an office skyscraper located at San Miguel Avenue (hence the building's name) in Ortigas Center, Pasig, Philippines. It was completed in 2001 and stands at 183 metres (600.39 feet) from ground up to the architectural top, although if measured with its antennas, it stands at 203 metres (666 feet). It has 54 floors aboveground and 7 basement levels.

Design and location
The One San Miguel Avenue is the first office tower owned and developed by Amberland Corporation, was designed by Filipino architectural firm Philip H. Recto Architects. Located along San Miguel Avenue corner Shaw Boulevard, it is currently one of the highest buildings in Pasig and in Ortigas Center as a whole, and is quite distinguishable due to its height and location. It is the home of the Manila Broadcasting Company which occupies the top four floors with executive offices, and a transmitter of DZMB and DWYS., and to a branch of international BPO company Sykes. It is also near numerous office and residential buildings, as well as major shopping malls like SM Megamall, Shangri-La Mall, and St. Francis Square.

The building has eight double-decker elevators.

Amenities
The building has 6 basement and 5 aboveground floors for parking of tenants and guests, a canteen at the 9th floor

References

Skyscrapers in Ortigas Center
Skyscraper office buildings in Metro Manila
Office buildings completed in 2001